Noam Gershony (born 30 January 1983) is an Israeli wheelchair tennis player. At the 2012 Summer Paralympics he won a gold medal in Quad singles and shared a bronze in Quad doubles with Shraga Weinberg.

Biography
Gershony served in the Israeli Defense Force as a pilot in the attack helicopter Boeing AH-64 Apache. During the 2006 Lebanon War his helicopter collided with another helicopter, an event which killed his co-pilot and left Gershony injured. He had many bone fractures and injuries in his four limbs. He went through medical rehabilitation and joined Beit Halochem sport centre in Tel Aviv where he started playing wheelchair tennis and surfing. Besides his sports career, Gershony volunteers at "Makom Acher", a hostel for at-risk youth in Tel Aviv, and teaches mathematics to teenagers.

Tennis career
Gerhsony joined Beit Halochem Sport Center for Disabled Veterans in 2007 and began training, led by Coach Nimrod Bichler. 

In December 2010, Gerhsony won first place in Quad Singles at an international tournament for wheelchair tennis in the Czech Republic. At the same tournament he also shared first place in the Quad Doubles with a French competitor. After this event he was ranked 29th in the world.

In September 2011 he qualified for the US Open finals. In November 2011 he won first place in the Tennis Masters Series in Belgium, in which the four best players in the world were participating. It was the first time an Israeli player qualified for the Quad Singles finals in that tournament.

In January 2012 he won first place in Australian Open events for wheelchair tennis in Sydney, after beating David Wagner, who was ranked second in the world.

In April 2012 he beat the gold medalist from the 2008 Summer Paralympics, Peter Norfolk, and won the Pensacola Open event.

In May 2012 he reached the Doubles Quad semi-finals in the Japan Open Tennis Championships.

On 1 July 2012 he won first place in Quad Singles in the French Open tournament, and shared second place in Quad Doubles with Boaz Kramer.

Later that year he participated in the 2012 Summer Paralympics. He won a gold medal in Quad Singles and shared a bronze medal with Shraga Weinberg. He was then selected to be his nation's flag-bearer at the 2012 Summer Paralympics closing ceremony.

References

External links
 
 
 
 

1983 births
Living people
Israeli male tennis players
Wheelchair tennis players
Paralympic wheelchair tennis players of Israel
Paralympic gold medalists for Israel
Paralympic bronze medalists for Israel
Paralympic medalists in wheelchair tennis
Medalists at the 2012 Summer Paralympics
Wheelchair tennis players at the 2012 Summer Paralympics
People from Kfar Saba
21st-century Israeli people